Sachin Pilgaonkar, often known mononymously by his screen name Sachin, is an Indian actor, director, producer, writer and singer of Marathi and Hindi films. He has directed and acted in several Marathi films of the late 1980s and early 1990s.

Starting as a child in the Marathi film, Ha Majha Marg Ekla (1962), he went on to work in around 65 films as a child artist, before switching to adult roles, and being part of highly successful films like Geet Gaata Chal (1975), Balika Badhu (1976), Ankhiyon Ke Jharokhon Se (1978) and Nadiya Ke Paar (1982) as a lead actor and he became a household name in India. He has worked in Hindi, Marathi and also in Kannada cinema and Bhojpuri cinema, and has acted, produced, and directed successful comedy shows on Indian television, including Tu Tu Main Main (2000) and Kadvee Khatti Meethi. He also directed several hit Marathi Films starting with Mai Baap (1982), Navri Mile Navryala (1984) was the biggest box office hit. Ashi Hi Banwa Banwi (1988) and Aamchya Sarkhe Aamhich (1990) were superhit at the box office. Navra Mazha Navsacha (2004) were hits as well. In 2007 Sachin also made his debut in the Kannada film industry in the film Ekadantha which was a remake of his own movie Navra Mazha Navsacha, with Kannada superstar Vishnuvardhan.

Early and personal life

Sachin was born in Mumbai in a Saraswat Brahmin family from Pilagaon, Goa. His father Sharad Pilgaonkar  was a film producer, and also managed a printing business in Mumbai.

He is married to actress Supriya Pilgaonkar (née Sabnis), whom he first directed for his debut Marathi film, Navri Mile Navryala (1984) and subsequently became successful pair in Marathi cinema. The couple has a daughter, Shriya Pilgaonkar.

Career

Films
Pilgaonkar started his film career as a child artist. He was to act in Madhavrao Shinde's 1961 film Soonbai, but the plans did not work out. He was then chosen for Raja Paranjape's Marathi film, Ha Maza Marg Ekla (1962) at the age of four, for which he won the National Award. Dr. Sarvepalli Radhakrishnan handed him the award. As a child actor, he first appeared in the Dharmendra-Meena Kumari starrer Majhli Didi, directed by Hrishikesh Mukherjee, and also appeared in prominent films such as Jewel Thief, Chanda Aur Bijli, Brahmachari and Mela. He worked closely with the then fellow child actor, Naeem Sayyed (better known as Junior Mehmood), with whom he first acted in the Shammi Kapoor-starrer Brahmachari at the age of eight. They did 15 films together as child artists.

He switched to playing lead roles for a brief time with Rajshri Productions' Geet Gaata Chal, for which he was cast opposite Sarika. The film's unexpected success made them a lead pair for other films. The pair went on to work in Zid, College Girl, Rajshri Productions and Nadiya Ke Paar.

With Trishul, he switched back to supporting roles and was part of successful movies such as Sholay, Avtaar, Sur Sangam and Satte Pe Satta, but as the demand for roles reduced he took to direction, making Marathi movies and producing TV serials. He is one of the most well-known Marathi film directors. In 1992, he directed Subhash Ghai's Prem Deewane, and in 1996 directed Aisi Bhi Kya Jaldi Hai.

In 2011 he directed and starred in Jaana Pehchana, which is a sequel to Sachin's earlier blockbuster film Ankhiyon Ke Jharokhon Se.

He acted in the 2015 film Katyar Kaljat Ghusli based on the play of the same name, playing Khasaheb Aftab Hussain. The role required him to speak in only Urdu, with which he was comfortable thanks to his training in the language by Meena Kumari in 1966 while together working on the film Majhli Didi. He also credits Sanjeev Kumar for helping him with the practicing of difficult scenes and Hrishikesh Mukherjee for teaching him to edit films.

Sachin, along with Laxmikant Berde, Ashok Saraf and Mahesh Kothare formed a successful quartet, starring in several hit movies in Marathi cinema in the 1980s and 1990s.

Television
Pilgaonkar turned to Indian Television in the 1990s, when he directed Hindi comedy show Tu Tu Main Main on Hindi National channel Star Plus, which starred his wife Supriya and Reema Lagoo. He also directed a show Rin 1 2 3 on the Hindi National channel DD Metro, which used to show parodies of Bollywood movies. He also directed the sitcom, Hadh Kar Di starring Dara Singh, which too initially did well, but later was pulled off. In the meantime, he also anchored Hindi music shows like Chalti Ka Naam Antakshari on Star Plus and various other events and Marathi film award ceremonies. In 2006, he, along with his wife, Supriya, won the Hindi dance Reality Show Nach Baliye, pocketing Rs. 4 million {Approx. $100,000}, beating nine other celebrity contestant pairs. In late 2007, he started a new program on Zee Marathi, known as Eka Peksha Ek, which is based on dance, finding hidden talent in all the areas of the state of Maharashtra.

He appeared as a judge of reality comedy talent show, Chhote Miyan (2009) on Colors TV.

Direction 

Pilgaonkar has also been directing Marathi films since the 1980s. He started directing with Mai Baap (1982) which received critical acclaim but started tasting commercial success only with 1984's Navri Mile Navryala, which also starred his future wife, Supriya Pilgaonkar. Further films like Gammat Jammat (1987) and Maza Pati Karodpati (1988) cemented his place in the Marathi film industry. Further, he tasted major success in 1988's Ashi Hi Banwa Banwi, which starred himself and the two reigning superstars of Marathi cinema, Ashok Saraf and Laxmikant Berde. The movie was a runaway hit, establishing Sachin as a hitmaker. He then changed track to the experimental cinema with the next two films, but returned to comedy with Aamchya Sarkhe Aamhich (1990) which proved to be yet another super hit. He directed Berde's son Abinay Berde in the 2018 film Ashi Hi Ashiqui, produced by Supriya Pilgaonkar.

Other pursuits 

In 2017, Sachin wrote his autobiography during the completion of 50 years of his film career titled Hach Maza Marg. For noted director Govind Nihalani's directorial debut in Marathi with the 2017 film Ti Ani Titar, Sachin wrote a ghazal titled "Badal jo ghir ke aaye" under the pseudonym of Shafaq.

In 2018, Sachin starred in the song Amchi Mumbai Changali Mumbai, which was widely panned by his fans.

Awards
 National Film Award for Best Child Artist for Ha Maza Marg Ekla (1962)
 19th National Film Awards (1971) – National Film Award for Best Child Artist for Ajab Tuje Sarkar
 1978 – Filmfare award 
 2009 – Maharashtracha Favourite Kon? for favourite jodi for the film Aamhi Satpute
 2016 – Filmfare Marathi Awards for best actor for the film Katyar Kaljat Ghusli
 2016 – Maharashtracha Favourite Kon? for favourite villain for the film Katyar Kaljat Ghusali

Filmography

As actor
Films

Television

As director 

Films

Television
Ek Do Teen Gane Jane Mane
Tu Tu Main Main
Hudd Kar Di
Tu Tota Main Maina
Gilli Danda

References

External links

 
 

Indian male film actors
Male actors in Hindi cinema
Male actors in Marathi cinema
Marathi film directors
Living people
1957 births
Indian male television actors
Indian television directors
Male actors from Mumbai
Indian male child actors
Indian male voice actors
Nach Baliye winners
Participants in Indian reality television series
Film directors from Mumbai
20th-century Indian film directors
21st-century Indian film directors
20th-century Indian male actors
21st-century Indian male actors
Best Child Artist National Film Award winners
Goan people